The Nottingham speedway team competed in the 1930s, with a home track on Trent Lane, Nottingham.

History
The track was first used in 1928, when the Nottingham Tornado Motorcycle Club put in a grass track but plans for greyhound racing had been discussed in early 1927 and the Greyhound Racing Association (GRA) ensured that they had a financial interest in the stadium.

In 1929 a dirt track was laid down by the Olympic Speedway Ltd over the grass track and the stadium was known as the Olympic Grounds and open matches were held. A Nottingham team competed in the Southern League in 1930 and 1931 but finished last in the league table on both occasions. During the 1931 season the team had completed 20 fixtures before they withdrew form the league.

In 1933, White City (Nottingham) Ltd constructed a new stadium known as the White City Stadium which included a new greyhound track and speedway circuit, replacing the original Olympic Grounds. The speedway team returned, competing in the National League but finished last once again and did not return for the 1934 season.

The team returned to the league in 1936, competing in the second tier called the Provincial League finishing third. The following season was the most successful as they won both the Provincial League Trophy and Coronation Cup and finished third in the league.

In 1938 the Provincial League became the National League Division Two; Nottingham started the season but withdrew after the final meeting to be held at Nottingham on 31 May 1938, with Leeds taking over the team's remaining fixtures.

The team were nicknamed 'The Lacemen', and also briefly the 'Wasps'.

Notable riders
George Greenwood
Nobby Key
Fred Strecker

Season summary

See also
White City Stadium (Nottingham)
Long Eaton Speedway

References

Defunct British speedway teams
Sport in Nottingham